Merry Mary is a 2007 South Korean television series starring Lee Ha-na, Ji Hyun-woo, Lee Min-woo, Wang Bit-na, and Lee Young-ha. It aired on MBC from May 16 to July 5, 2007, on Wednesdays and Thursdays at 21:55 for 16 episodes.

Cast

Main characters
Lee Ha-na – Hwang Me-ri
Ji Hyun-woo – Kang Dae-gu
Lee Min-woo – Seo Do-jin
Wang Bit-na – Lee So-ra
Lee Young-ha – Park Heung-bok

Supporting characters
Gi Ju-bong – Hwang Do-chul
Lee Hye-sook – Oh Seung-ja
Ahn Yeon-hong – Jang Eun-ja
Lee Byung-joon

Additional cast members
Kim Hye-jung – Kim Bu-gil
Kim Joo-young – Hwang Dae-han
Lee Joo-hyun
Jang Jung-hee
Kim Yong-hee
Kim Mi-so
Moon Ga-young
Song Young-kyu
Park Yoon-bae

Original soundtrack

Awards and nominations

References

External links
 
 

2007 South Korean television series debuts
2007 South Korean television series endings
MBC TV television dramas
South Korean comedy-drama television series
South Korean romance television series